African French is the generic name of the varieties of the French language spoken by an estimated 141 million people in Africa in 2018, spread across 34 countries and territories. This includes those who speak French as a first or second language in these 34 African countries and territories (dark and light blue on the map), but it does not include French speakers living in other African countries. Africa is thus the continent with the most French speakers in the world. French arrived in Africa as a colonial language; these African French speakers are now a large part of the Francophonie.

In Africa, French is often spoken alongside indigenous languages, but in a number of urban areas (in particular in Central Africa and in the ports located on the Gulf of Guinea) it has become a first language, such as in the region of Abidjan, Côte d'Ivoire, in the urban areas of Douala and Yaoundé in Cameroon or in Libreville, Gabon. In some countries it is a first language among some classes of the population, such as in Tunisia, Morocco, Mauritania and Algeria, where French is a first language among the upper classes along with Arabic (many people in the upper classes are simultaneous bilinguals in Arabic/French), but only a second language among the general population.

In each of the francophone African countries, French is spoken with local variations in pronunciation and vocabulary.

List of countries in Africa by French proficiency 
French proficiency in African countries according to the Organisation internationale de la Francophonie (OIF).

Varieties
There are many different varieties of African French, but they can be broadly grouped into five categories:
the French spoken by people in West and Central Africa – spoken altogether by about 97 million people in 2018, as either a first or second language.
the French variety spoken by Maghrebis and Berbers in Northwest Africa (see Maghreb French), which has about 33 million first and second language speakers in 2018.
the French variety spoken in Djibouti in the Horn of Africa, which has about 0.5 million first and second language speakers in 2018.
the French variety spoken by Creoles in the Indian Ocean (Réunion, Mauritius and Seychelles), which has around 1.75 million first and second language speakers in 2018. The French spoken in this region is not to be confused with the French-based creole languages, which are also spoken in the area.
the French varieties spoken in Eastern Africa (Madagascar, Comoros, Mayotte), which have 5.6 million first and second language speakers in 2018.

All the African French varieties differ from standard French, both in terms of pronunciation and vocabulary, but the formal African French used in education, media and legal documents is based on standard French vocabulary.

In the colonial period, a vernacular form of creole French known as Petit nègre ("little negro") was also present in West Africa. The term has since, however, become a pejorative term for "poorly spoken" African French.

V. Y. Mudimbe describes African French as possessing "approximate pronunciation, repressed syntax, bloated or tortured vocabulary, intonation, rhythm and accent stuck in the original African language flow; many phonetic, morphologic and lexical africanisms." The differences from European French are due to influence from the mother tongues and the complexity of French grammatical rules, which inhibit its learning by most non-native speakers.

The difficulty linguists have in describing African French comes from variations, such as the "pure" language used by many African intellectuals and writers versus the mixtures between French and African languages. For this, the term "creolization" is used, often in a pejorative way, and especially in the areas where French is on the same level with one or more local languages. According to Gabriel Manessy, "The consequences of this concurrency may vary according to the social status of the speakers, to their occupations, to their degree of acculturation and thus to the level of their French knowledge."

Code-switching, or the alternation of languages within a single conversation, takes place in both Senegal and Democratic Republic of Congo, the latter having four "national" languages – Kikongo, Lingala, Ciluba and Swahili – which are in a permanent opposition to French. Code-switching has been studied since colonial times by different institutions of linguistics. One of these, located in Dakar, Senegal, already spoke of the creolization of French in 1968, naming the result "franlof": a mix of French and Wolof (the language most spoken in Senegal) which spreads by its use in urban areas and through schools, where teachers often speak Wolof in the classroom despite official instructions.

The omnipresence of local languages in francophone African countries – along with insufficiencies in education – has given birth to a new linguistic concept: le petit français. Le petit français is the result of a superposition of the structure of a local language with a narrowed lexical knowledge of French. The specific structures, though very different, are juxtaposed, marking the beginning of the creolization process.

Français populaire africain 
In the urban areas of francophone Africa, another type of French has emerged: Français populaire africain ("Popular African French") or FPA. It is used in the entirety of sub-Saharan Africa, but especially in cities such as Abidjan, Ivory Coast; Ouagadougou, Burkina Faso; Dakar, Senegal; Cotonou, Benin; and Lomé, Togo. At its emergence, it was marginalized and associated with the ghetto; Angèle Bassolé-Ouedraogo describes the reaction of the scholars:

However, FPA has begun to emerge as a second language among the upper class. It has also become a symbol of social acceptance.

FPA can be seen as a progressive evolution of Ivorian French. After diffusing out of Ivory Coast, it became Africanized under the influence of young Africans (often students) and cinema, drama, and dance.

FPA has its own grammatical rules and lexicon. For example, "" or "" can either mean "This person annoys me very much (literally he or she is annoying me to death)" or "I'm dying (out of love) for him/her" depending on the circumstances. "" signifies a feeling of exasperation (whereupon it actually means "he or she starts to appeal to me"), and friendship can be expressed with "" or ""

FPA is mainly composed of metaphors and images taken from African languages. For example, the upper social class is called "" (the above from above) or "" (the powerful môgôs).

Pronunciation 
Pronunciation in the many varieties of African French can be quite varied. There are nonetheless some trends among African French speakers; for instance,  tends to be pronounced as the historic alveolar trill of pre-20th Century French instead of the now standard uvular trill or 'guttural R.'

Abidjan French 

According to some estimates, French is spoken by 75 to 99 percent of Abidjan's population, either alone or alongside indigenous African languages. There are three sorts of French spoken in Abidjan. A formal French is spoken by the educated classes. Most of the population, however, speaks a colloquial form of French known as français de Treichville (after a working-class district of Abidjan) or français de Moussa (after a character in chronicles published by the magazine Ivoire Dimanche which are written in this colloquial Abidjan French). Finally, an Abidjan French slang called  has evolved from an ethnically neutral lingua franca among uneducated youth into a creole language with a distinct grammar. New words often appear in Nouchi and then make their way into colloquial Abidjan French after some time. As of 2012, a crowdsourced dictionary of Nouchi is being written using mobile phones.

Here are some examples of words used in the African French variety spoken in Abidjan (the spelling used here conforms to French orthography, except ô which is pronounced ):
 is a slang word meaning a girl or a girlfriend. It is a loanword either from the Mandinka language or from English ("girl"). It is also French hip-hop slang for a girl.
 is a colloquial word meaning a street-side eatery, a working-class restaurant serving African food. This word exists in standard French, but its meaning is "maquis shrubland", and by extension "guerrilla", see Maquis (World War II). It is not known exactly how this word came to mean street-side restaurant in Côte d'Ivoire.
 is a slang word equivalent to "bloke" or "dude" in English. It is a loanword from the Mandinka language.
 is a word meaning to whip, to beat, or to chastise (children). It is a loanword from Portuguese where it meant "to whip (the black slaves)". It has now entered the formal language of the educated classes.
 is a slang word meaning money.
Note that some local words are used across several African countries. For example,  is attested not only in Côte d'Ivoire but also in Senegal, Mali, Niger, Burkina Faso, Chad, the Central African Republic, Benin, Togo and the Democratic Republic of the Congo.

As already mentioned, these local words range from slang to formal usage, and their use therefore varies depending on the context. In Abidjan, this is how the sentence "The girl stole my money." is constructed depending on the register:
formal Abidjan French of the educated people: 
colloquial Abidjan French:  (in standard French, the grammatically correct sentence should be )
Abidjan French slang (Nouchi):  ( is an Abidjan slang word meaning "to steal")
Another unique, identifiable feature of Ivorian French is the use of the phrase n'avoir qu'à + infinitif which, translated into English, roughly means, to have only to + infinitive. The phrase is often used in linguistic contexts of expressing a wish or creating hypotheticals. This original Ivorian phrase is generally used across the Ivory Coast's population; children, uneducated adults, and educated adults all using the phrase relatively equally. Often in written speech, the phrase is written as Ils non cas essayer de voir rather than Ils n'ont qu'à essayer de voir.

Linguistic Characteristics 
Many linguistic characteristics of Ivorian/Abidjan French differ from a "standard" French found in France. Many of these linguistic evolutions are due to the influences of native African languages spoken within the Ivory Coast, making Abidjan French a distinct dialect of French. 

Some of the major phonetic and phonological variations of Abidjan French, as compared to a more "typical" French, include substituting the  nasal low vowel [ɑ̃] for a non-nasal [a], especially when the sound occurs at the beginning of a word as well as some difficulty with the full production of the phonemes [ʒ] and [ʃ]. There also exists, to a certain degree, rhythmic speaking speaking patterns in Ivorian French that are influenced by native languages.

Ivorian French is also unique in its grammatical differences present in spoken speech. Some of these grammatical changes include:

 omission of articles in some contexts (ex. tu veux poisson instead of the French tu veux du poisson)
 omission of prepositions in some contexts (ex. Il parti Yamoussoukro rather than Il est parti à Yamoussoukro)
 interchangeable usage of indirect & direct complements (using lui instead of le and vice versa)
 more flexible grammatical formation

Kinshasa French 

With more than 11 million inhabitants, Kinshasa is the largest francophone city in the world, recently passing Paris in population. It is the capital of the most populous francophone country in the world, the Democratic Republic of the Congo, where an estimated 43 million people (51% of the total population) can speak French (essentially as a second language). Contrary to Abidjan where French is the first language of a large part of the population, in Kinshasa French is only a second language, and its status of lingua franca is shared with Lingala. Kinshasa French also differs from other African French variants, for it has some Belgian French influences, due to colonization. People of different African mother tongues living in Kinshasa usually speak Lingala to communicate with each other in the street, but French is the language of businesses, administrations, schools, newspapers and televisions. French is also the predominant written language.

Due to its widespread presence in Kinshasa, French has become a local language with its own pronunciation and some local words borrowed for the most part from Lingala. Depending on their social status, some people may mix French and Lingala, or code switch between the two depending on the context. Here are examples of words particular to Kinshasa French. As in Abidjan, there exist various registers and the most educated people may frown upon the use of slangish/Lingala terms.

 means broken, worn out, exhausted, or dead. It is a neologism on the standard French word  whose meaning in standard French is "corpse". The word  has now spread to other African countries due to the popularity of Congolese music in Africa.
 means strong, resistant. It is a loanword from Lingala.
 are sunglasses worn by partiers at night. It is a word coined locally and whose literal meaning in standard French is "anti-night". It is one of the many Kinshasa slang words related to nightlife and partying.
, literally "to break the Bic", means to stop going to school.  is colloquially used to refer to a ballpoint pen in Belgian French and Kinshasa French, but not in standard French.
 means "thank you very much". It comes from standard French  ("thank you") and Lingala  ("a lot").
 is a bottle opener. It comes from the Lingala verb  which means "to open something that is blocked up or bottled", to which was added the standard French suffix .
 is a rickety old taxi. In standard French  means "tetanus".
 means "absolutely impossible".
 means to have a mistress.  doesn't mean "He has two offices", but "He has two mistresses".
 means "fend for yourself" or "find what you need by yourself". 
 means "thank you" or "you are welcome". When it means "thank you", it can offend some French speakers who are not aware of its special meaning in Kinshasa. For example, if one offers a present to a person, they will often reply . In standard French, it means "I don't mind".
 is the way Kinois say 81,  in Europe. 
, literally to make things "complicated" or difficult for someone. It can be anyone: , "She is giving me a tough time".
 is something someone does to make another person's life harder, and often refers to policemen or soldiers.

Linguistic Characteristics 
There are many linguistic differences that occur in Kinshasa French that make it a distinct dialect of French. Similarly to many other African dialects of French, many of these linguistic aspects are influenced, either directly or indirectly, by the linguistics of the local African languages spoken. It is also essential to note grammatical differences between local Congolese languages and the French language, such as the lack of gendered nouns in the former, which result in linguistic changes when speakers of Congolese native languages speak French.

Some of the phonetic characteristics of Kinshasa French include:

 the posteriorization of anterior, labial vowels in French, more specifically, the posteriorization of the common French phoneme [ɥ] for [u] (ex. pronunciation of the French word cuisine [kɥizin] as couwisine [kuwizin])
 the delabialization of the phoneme [y] for the phoneme [i] (ex. pronunciation of the French term bureau [byʁo] as biro [biʁo])
 the vocalic opening of the French phoneme [œ] creating, instead, the phoneme [ɛ] (ex. pronunciation of the French word acteur [aktœʁ] as actère [aktɛʁ])
 in some cases, the denasalization of French vowels (ex. pronunciation of the French term bande [bɑ̃d] as ba-nde [band])
 the mid-nasalization of occlusive consonants that follow the nasals [n] and [m] (ex. in relationship to the example above, the French word bande [bɑ̃d] could be pronounced both as ba-nde [band] or as ban-nde with a slightly nasalized [d])
 the palatalization of French apico-dental consonants that are followed by [i] and/or [ɥ] (ex. pronunciation of the French word dix [dis] is pronounced as dzix [dzis] and, similarly, the term parti may be pronounced as partsi)
As briefly mentioned above, because many Congolese languages are ungendered languages, there is often some mixing of the French masculine and feminine articles in speakers of Kinshasa French, such as the phrase Je veux du banane rather than the "correct" French Je veux de la banane.

See also

French colonial empire
Belgian colonial empire
Romance-speaking African countries
Geographical distribution of French speakers
Camfranglais
List of colonies and possessions of France
Belgian Congo
Maghreb French
Françafrique
Francophonie
French-based creole languages
French language in Minnesota
French language in Vietnam
French language in Cambodia
French language in Laos
French Polynesia
Languages of Africa

Notes

References

External links
 LE FRANÇAIS EN AFRIQUE - Revue du Réseau des Observatoires du Français Contemporain en Afrique
 Links for Afrique francophone
 Dictionaries of various French-speaking countries
  Le Français et le Français populaire Africain: partenariat, cohabitation ou défiance? FPA, appartenance sociale, diversité linguistique 
 La mondialisation, une chance pour la francophonie 
 RFI - L’avenir du français passe par l’Afrique 

 
French dialects
Languages of the African diaspora